The Vogelheimer Klinge (German: Vogelheim Blade) is an approximately 280,000 year old flint tool, discovered in 1926 during the construction of the Rhine-Herne Canal in Vogelheim, north of the city of Essen. In older publications it is also known as the Klingenschaber von Vogelheim. It was long considered to be the oldest accurately dated artifact in North Rhine-Westphalia and can be found in the :de:Ruhr Museum.

References
 
 :de:Detlef Hopp: Essen Vogelheim – die Vogelheimer Klinge, in: H. G. Horn: Neandertaler + Co., von Zabern, Mainz 2006, S. 145–147.
 Gerhard Bosinski, :de:Michael Baales, Olaf Jöris, Martin Street, :de:Thorsten Uthmeier: Arbeiten zum Paläolithikum und zum Mesolithikum in Nordrhein-Westfalen, in: :de:Heinz Günter Horn (ed..): Fundort Nordrhein-Westfalen. Millionen Jahre Geschichte, Römisch-Germanisches Museum, Köln 2000, S. 91–102, hier: S. 91.

External links
 * Fotografie, Datierung unzutreffend

Tools
Primitive technology